José Luis Villacañas Berlanga (born in 1955) is a Spanish political philosopher and historian of political ideas.

Biography 
Born in Úbeda on 10 June 1955, he studied in the Colegio de la Sagrada Familia in his native town. He graduated in Philosophy in the University of Valencia in 1977; he later obtained his PhD in Philosophy with Realismo empírico e idealismo trascendental en la filosofía teórica de Kant. Los niveles de uso y de justificación in the same university. He has been full professor in the University of Murcia (UM) and, since 2009, in the Complutense University of Madrid (UCM).

Works

References 

Political philosophers
Living people
1955 births
Historians of philosophy
Historians of political thought
Carl Schmitt scholars